Heinrich Zille (1858 – 1929), German artist
 Helen Zille (born 1951), South African politician
 Zille (boat), a type of small barge used on the Danube river and tributaries in Germany and Austria

See also 
 15724 Zille, an asteroid.